A children's hospital is a hospital which offers its services exclusively to children.

Children's Hospital may also refer to:
 Childrens Hospital, a 2008–2016 American TV series
 Children's Hospital (Australian TV series), a 1997–1998 television series that aired on ABC
 Children's Hospital (UK TV series), a 1993–2003 documentary television series
 The Children's Hospital, a 2006 novel by Chris Adrian

See also
Children's Hospital Association
Foundling hospital
 "In the Children's Hospital", an 1880 poem by Alfred, Lord Tennyson
List of children's hospitals
List of children's hospitals in the United States
:Category:Children's hospitals
:Category:Children's hospitals by country
:Category:Children's hospitals in the United States